The Peugeot 505 is a large family car produced by the French manufacturer Peugeot from 1979 to 1992 in Sochaux, France. It was also manufactured in various other countries including Argentina (by Sevel from 1981 to 1995), China, Thailand (by Yontrakit Industrial Co.,Ltd.), Indonesia and Nigeria. The 505 was Peugeot's last rear-wheel drive car.

According to the manufacturer, 1,351,254 505s were produced between 1978 and 1999 with 1,116,868 of these being saloons/sedans.

History
Officially unveiled on 16 May 1979, the 505 was the replacement for the 504 with which it shared many of its underpinnings. It was originally available as a sedan/saloon, a station wagon/estate, including an eight-passenger Familiale version, were introduced at the 1982 Geneva Motor Show. The styling, a collaboration between Pininfarina and Peugeot's internal styling department, is very similar to that of the smaller 305. The original interior was designed by Paul Bracq, generally more well known for his work for Mercedes-Benz and BMW. It is known as the "Work Horse" of Africa today.

After initially being produced only in left-hand drive form for its first few months, the 505 was available in right-hand drive form for the UK market from October 1979. Its best selling competitor in the UK was the Ford Granada. 

The 505 was praised by contemporary journalists for its ride and handling, especially on rough and unmade roads; perhaps one reason for its popularity in less developed countries; - "Remember that the 505´s predecessor, the 504, had an outstanding ride. It took a British-market model on a hard charging drive across the green lanes of the Chilterns. The impacts were well suppressed and the car veritably floated over the undulations and potholes. I concluded that the 505 is as good as the 504 (but no better)." The 505 also had good ground clearance; if it wasn't enough though, Dangel offered a taller four-wheel drive version of the 505 Break/Familiale equipped with either the intercooled turbodiesel 110 hp (81 kW) engine or the 130 hp 2.2 L petrol (96 kW) engine. The four-wheel drive 505 also had shorter gear ratios.

The interior styling was viewed positively in contemporary reviews: "Having settled into the 505's neat cockpit one notices how handsomely styled it all would appear to be. The tweed seats and brown trim look smart and less confrontational than offerings from a certain other French marque." But British smokers found fault with the ergonomics: "The ashtray was competitively sized but is placed directly behind the gear stick. For British market cars, this will be a constant nuisance while our continental cousins will consider the placement quite logical and natural."

The estate model was launched in 1982, and was available with seven seats, just like the Peugeot 504 estate. Also new in 1982 was the fully equipped 505 STI, equipped with the all-new 2165 cc four-cylinder Douvrin engine developed together with Renault.

The range was given a facelift, including an all new interior, in 1986, but European Peugeot 505 production began to wind down following the launch of the smaller Peugeot 405 in 1987. Saloon production came to a halt in 1989, when Peugeot launched its new flagship 605 saloon, while the estate remained in production until 1992 - although plans for an estate version of the 605 never materialised. The 605 was in production for a decade but never matched the popularity of the 505. In some countries such as France and Germany, the 505 estate was used as an ambulance, a funeral car, police car, military vehicle and as a road maintenance vehicle. There were prototypes of 505 coupés and 505 trucks, and in France many people have modified 505s into pickup trucks themselves.

The 505 was one of the last Peugeot models to be sold in the United States, with sedan sales ending there in 1990 and wagon sales in 1991. The last sedans sold had PRV's 2.8 V6 engine only. Unique to the US were turbocharged station wagons, both with petrol and diesel engines. 505s were also sold in Australia (where they were assembled by Renault Australia from 1980 to 1981, and by Leyland Australia from 1981 to 1983), Argentina, Chile, China, and New Zealand. In New York City, Peugeot 505 diesels were briefly used as taxicabs.

The car was summed up as follows by motoring writer Archie Vicar: "The 505 is a saloon with quite a pleasant appearance, quite efficient engines, quite comfortable seating, quite nice steering and a quite reasonable price. And it is quite well constructed. So, you might say it was merely average. But can it really be that simple? Have Peugeot in fact, played a very clever game where, instead of dazzling us with technology or breathtaking styling, they have decided to woo us with understatement of the profoundest kind?"

In Thailand, the Peugeot 505 sold well. It was available as a CKD version assembled in Bangkok, due to the restrictions on importing completely built-up cars.

Mechanical characteristics
The 505 had rear-wheel drive and the engine at the front, mounted longitudinally. The suspension system included MacPherson struts and coil springs at front and semi-trailing arms with coil springs at rear, with a body-mounted rear differential and four constant-velocity joints.  Station wagons (and most sedans built in Argentina) had instead a live-axle rear suspension, with Panhard rod and coil springs. Stabilizer bars were universal at front but model-dependent at rear. The car used disc brakes at the front, and either disc or drum brakes at the rear, depending on the model. The steering was a rack and pinion system, which was power assisted on most models.

Break/Familiale 

Introduced in the spring of 1982, the Break (Estate) and Familiale versions were quite different from saloons. This was, not coincidentally, the same exact wheelbase as had been used on both the 404 and 504 estate derivatives.

The Familiale (family estate), with its third row of bench seats (giving a total of eight forward-facing seats), was popular with larger families and as a taxi. The two rows of rear seats could be folded to give a completely flat load area, with 1.94 cubic metres of load capacity. When released, it was hailed as a luxury touring wagon. The Familiale was marketed as the "SW8" in the United States, for "station wagon, eight seats."

In France, Dangel modified the Peugeot 505 Break with high suspension and 4WD which looks like an SUV.

Engines 

A range of diesel and petrol engines were offered. The first diesels (XD2) arrived in July 1979, two months after the petrol versions. The turbocharged petrol unit was first seen in 1984 (for the 1985 model year in the United States).

505s were mainly equipped with inline-four-cylinder engines, although there was a short run of petrol V6's built after 604 production had come to an end.

Trim levels 

Peugeot 505 models varied very much in equipment.  Base SRD cars with the 2,304 cc diesel engine didn't even have power steering, but the GTD Turbo, the GTI, the V6, and the TI all had power steering, central locking doors, air conditioning, a five-speed manual transmission, sunroof (except the GTD Turbo), and front fog lights. In the V6, the power steering was speed-sensitive, the central locking doors came with an infrared remote, and the heating and ventilation systems included electronic climate control. A three-speed automatic transmission was available on early 505s, which was later replaced by a four-speed unit. The most durable 505 model proved to be the GTD with a five-speed manual transmission. In Australia, the 505 was sold as a GR, SR, STi, or GTi sedan, or an SR or GTi eight-seater station wagon, all with petrol engines. Very few GRD and SRD diesel-engined 505s were sold in Australia. The Series II update saw the SR replaced with an SLi.

North America
The United States and Canada had their own 505 body, which arrived for 1980 and was first introduced on the French Caribbean island of Martinique. Notable differences were: gas tank moved inwards (now behind rear bench), with filling neck on rightside, different style quad headlamps, taillights (pre-1986 sedans), distinctive whip antenna moved from roof to rear fender (and changed to telescopic), larger bumpers, tailpipe moved from right to left. Fewer engines were offered, all detuned to meet more restrictive emission standards. The models sold in North America were: Base, "GL", "S", "GLS", "STI", "DL", "Liberté", "STX", "Turbo", "GLX", "SW8", "V6", "Turbo S". Both were carryovers from the 504, although the gasoline unit had gained eight horsepower thanks to the introduction of fuel injection.

Diesel sales were strong in the aftermath of the energy crisis, with diesels reaching a peak level representing 85 percent (14,430 diesels) of the company's US sales in 1981 (their best year in the US). Both the XD2S and larger XD3T were available in the US for model years 1985 and 1986, with the smaller engine being fitted to station wagons. By 1986, after the Oldsmobile diesel debacle and many years of stable fuel prices, only the turbodiesel remained and diesel sales were down to a share of just over 10 percent (1,545 out of 14,439). New for 1987 was the limited edition Liberté model (so named in honor of the centennial celebration of the Statue of Liberty). Diesel engines were no longer available in the US after 1987.

All North-American bound 505's were built in Peugeot's Sochaux Plant, in France. Unlike the naturally aspirated model, the turbodiesel received a five-speed manual as standard fitment. In the late spring of 1984, the 1985 505 Turbo arrived. The engine was similar to the one seen in Europe, albeit without an intercooler initially. The Turbo estate version was unique to the North American markets.

Notes and references

External links 
 

1980s cars
1990s cars
Cars introduced in 1979
Mid-size cars
505
Rear-wheel-drive vehicles
Sedans
Station wagons
Cars discontinued in 1997